is an autobahn in Germany, connecting Dortmund in the west with Aschaffenburg in the southwest. It is colloquially known as the Sauerlandlinie (Sauerland line) as it runs through the hilly, rural Sauerland region between Hagen and Siegen. The A45 has many bridges to cross valleys, the highest of which is the Sichter Valley bridge (Talbrücke Sichter) between Lüdenscheid and Meinerzhagen at 530 metres above mean sea level. It is mostly two lanes each way with frequent climbing lanes between Dortmund-Hafen and the Gambacher Kreuz intersection. In March 2013 30 people were injured in a pile-up on the A45.

History 
During the 1960s and 1970s a southward extension was proposed as the „Odenwald-Neckar-Alb-Autobahn“ (ONAA), to pass through  Groß-Umstadt, Michelstadt, Schwaigern, Neckarwestheim, Mundelsheim, Berglen, Remshalden, Lichtenwald and Schlierbach, linking the ONAA to the A 8 near Kirchheim unter Teck, however the project was abandoned for ecological reasons in 1979 by the state government of Baden-Württemberg.

Trajectory 
The A 45 branches off the A 2 at the Dortmund Nord-West intersection, passes through the eastern Ruhr area and enters the Sauerland near Hagen. It then enters the Siegerland and the state of Hesse, where the A 45 is joined by the A 66 between the interchanges Hanauer Kreuz and Langenselbolder Dreieck. A short stretch of road, between junctions Alzenau and Mainhausen, is on Bavarian territory, then the A 45 merges with the A 3 at the interchange Seligenstädter Dreieck in the state of Hesse, just to the west of the Bavarian city of Aschaffenburg. The Rahmede viaduct near Lüdenscheid was closed on 2 December 2021, due to damage to its structure. It is to be demolished and replaced.

Numerical listing of Exits and Junctions 

 

|}

External links 
 

45
A045
A045
A045